Malykhan (Maalıkaan) is a rural locality (a selo), one of three settlements, in addition to Sanyyakhtakh, Alexeyevka and Markha, in Sanyyakhtakhsky Rural Okrug of Olyokminsky District in the Sakha Republic, Russia. Its population as of the 2002 Census was 132.

References

Notes

Sources
Official website of the Sakha Republic. Registry of the Administrative-Territorial Divisions of the Sakha Republic. Olyokminsky District. 

Rural localities in Olyokminsky District